Loaita Cay, also known as Melchora Aquino Island (Mandarin ), is an island in the Spratly Islands.

The island is administered by the Philippines as part of Kalayaan, Palawan, and is the seventh largest of the Philippine-occupied islands. It is also claimed by the People's Republic of China, the Republic of China (Taiwan), and Vietnam.

Environment
The island is a low, flat, sandy cay, and is subject to erosion. It changes its shape seasonally. The sand build up depends largely on the direction of prevailing winds and waves; it has taken an elongated shape for some years. Like Flat Island and Lankiam Cay, it is barren of any vegetation. No underground water source has been found in the area.

History

On 22 May 1963, a sovereignty stele was rebuilt on Loaita Island by crew members of the three vessels Huong Giang, Chi Lang and Ky Hoa of the South Vietnam.

Presently, the island serves as a military observation outpost, and is guarded by Philippine soldiers stationed at nearby Loaita Island who regularly visit. It is kept under observation from a tall structure on Loaita Island.

The location of this outpost, which the Philippines calls Panata Island, is often misreported as being on Lankiam Cay, to the east of Loaita Island. While reports suggest Lankiam was once a small sandy cay, it appears to have been washed away, leaving only a submerged reef and a small, shifting sand bar. If there was ever a Filipino facility there, it was moved to Loaita Cay and took the name “Panata Island” with it.

See also
Policies, activities and history of the Philippines in Spratly Islands

References

External links
Asia Maritime Transparency Initiative Island Tracker

Islands of the Spratly Islands
Kalayaan, Palawan
Loaita Bank